Alexander Gordon may refer to:

 Alexander Gordon, 1st Earl of Huntly (died 1470), Scottish magnate
 Alexander Gordon (bishop of Aberdeen) (died 1518), Precentor of Moray and Bishop-elect of Aberdeen
 Alexander Gordon, 3rd Earl of Huntly (died 1524), Scottish nobleman
 Alexander Gordon, Master of Sutherland (died 1530), Scottish magnate
 Alexander Gordon (bishop of Galloway) (died 1575), formerly bishop of the Isles and archbishop of Glasgow
 Alexander Gordon (pioneer) (1635–1697), Scottish settler in New England
 Alexander Gordon (general) (1670–1752), Laird of Auchintoul, Scottish general of the Russian army and Jacobite
 Alexander Gordon (antiquary) (c. 1692–1755), Scottish antiquary and singer
 Alexander Gordon, 2nd Duke of Gordon (c. 1678–1728), Scottish peer
 Alexander Gordon, 18th-century British founder of Gordon's Gin
 Alexander Gordon, Lord Rockville (1739–1792), Scottish judge
 Alexander Gordon (physician) (1752–1799), Scottish physician
 Alexander Snow Gordon (died 1803), American silversmith and inn-keeper
 Alexander Gordon, 4th Duke of Gordon (1743–1827), Scottish nobleman
 Alexander Gordon (British cavalry officer) (1781–1873), British Army officer during the Napoleonic Wars
 Sir Alexander Gordon (British staff officer) (1786–1815), British Army officer who was killed at the Battle of Waterloo
 Alexander Gordon (Australian politician) (1815–1903), English-born Australian politician and barrister
 Alexander Gordon (Unitarian) (1841–1931), English Unitarian minister and religious historian
 Alexander Theodore Gordon (1881–1919), Scottish politician
 Sir Alexander Gordon (Northern Ireland politician) (1882–1967)
 Alexander Esmé Gordon (1910–1993), Scottish architect
 Sandy Grant Gordon (1931–2020), Scottish distiller
 Alexander V. Gordon (born 1937), Russian historian, historiographer, socio-anthropologist, culturologist
 Alexander Gordon, 7th Marquess of Aberdeen and Temair (1955–2020), British peer 
 Alexander Gordon (journalist) (born 1964), Russian radio and television presenter, journalist, actor and director
 Alexander Gordon (brewer) (1818-1895), Scottish brewer and philanthropist

See also
 Alex Gordon (disambiguation)
 Alexander Hamilton-Gordon (disambiguation)
 Alexander Gordon Smith (born 1979), British author